Christine Feehan (born Christine King in Ukiah, California) is an American author of paranormal romance, paranormal military thrillers, and fantasy.  She is a #1 New York Times, #1 Publishers Weekly, and International bestselling author of seven series; Carpathian (aka Dark Series), GhostWalker Series, Drake Sisters, Sister of the Heart (Sea Haven) Series, Shadow Riders Series, Leopard Series and Torpedo Ink Series. Six of the seven series have made #1 on the New York Times bestseller list. As of January 2020 she has 80 published novels. The first in her Torpedo Ink Series, Judgment Road, debuted at #1 on the New York Times bestsellers list.

Biography 
Christine Feehan was born in Ukiah, California. She grew up with three brothers and ten sisters. She spent a lot of time getting in trouble at school for writing instead of doing the things she was supposed to do. Later she forced her ten sisters to read every word.

Feehan's first job was working in a library, then she went on to take journalism classes and worked at the Ukiah Journal.

Feehan trained in martial arts, earning a 3rd degree black belt in Tang Soo Do, going on to acquire her instructor's license.  She taught martial arts for over twenty years, specializing in women's self-defense.

Career 
Time magazine said, "After Bram Stoker, Anne Rice, and Joss Whedon (who created the venerated Buffy the Vampire Slayer), Christine Feehan is the person most credited with popularizing the neck gripper." USA Today called her "The Queen of paranormal romance."

Feehan has been published in multiple languages and in many formats, including audio book, e-book, hardcover and large print.  In October 2007 her first manga comic, Dark Hunger, was released in stores.  This was the first manga comic released by Berkley Publishing and it made #11 on Publishers Weekly Bestseller's List.

Feehan's ground-breaking book trailer commercials have been shown on TV and in movie theaters. She has been featured on local TV, and appeared on The Montel Williams Show. Dark Legend was featured on the cover of Romantic Times Magazine, Dark Challenge was seen in the movie Kate & Leopold starring Meg Ryan and Hugh Jackman, and several of her books appeared in the 2017 movie Happy Death Day.

Feehan has appeared as an honored guest at numerous writers’ conventions, including Romantic Times Convention, Get Caught Reading at Sea Cruise, Celebrate Romance Conference, Emerald City Conference, and numerous Romance Writers of America Conferences. She was also a special guest at the 2013 San Diego Comic-Con.

Personal life 
Feehan has eleven children and several grandchildren, as well as fourteen brothers and sisters. Her son, Calvert, passed away in the 1990s following a motorcycle accident.

In 2015 her family home in Cobb, California, burned down in the Valley Fire.

Feehan lives in Mendocino, California, near the ocean in the Redwoods. She has several dogs, including two large black Russian terriers.

Bibliography

Awards 
Feehan is a #1 New York Times best selling author of seven series. She has won multiple Paranormal Excellence Awards for Romantic Literature (PEARL) and Romantic Times awards. She has been on  bestsellers list, including those of Publishers Weekly   and USA Today. Feehan has also received a Career Achievement Award from Romantic Times and has been nominated for a RITA award by the Romance Writers of America.

#1 New York Times Best Sellers List

Romantic Times Awards

Paranormal Excellence Awards in Romantic Literature (PEARL) Awards

Other Awards

References

External links 
 
 Christine Feehan at the Internet Book Database
 

20th-century American novelists
American fantasy writers
American romantic fiction novelists
Living people
American paranormal romance writers
21st-century American novelists
American women novelists
Women science fiction and fantasy writers
Women romantic fiction writers
20th-century American women writers
21st-century American women writers
Year of birth missing (living people)
People from Ukiah, California
Novelists from California